Volando bajo is a 2014 Mexican film directed by Beto Gómez.

Plot
Chuyin Venegas and Cornelio Barraza were the greatest stars of popular music and cinema in the 80's and 90's. After decades of success as "Los Jilgueros de Rosarito", they went their separate ways; but their story was far from over.

Cast

Gerardo Taracena as Chuyin Venegas
Ludwika Paleta as Toribia Venegas
Sandra Echeverría as Sara Medrano
Ana Brenda Contreras as Mariana Arredondo
Rodrigo Oviedo as Cornelio Barraza
Rafael Inclán as Lucho Venegas Reyes
Randy Vasquez as Lorenzo Scarfioti
Livia Brito as Ana Bertha Miranda
María Elisa Camargo as Natalie Johnson
Isabella Camil as Ingrid Larsson
Altair Jarabo as Abigail Restrepo-Mares
Ingrid Martz as Eva Inés Casanova
Javier López as Bruno Sánchez Félix
Dan Rovzar as Gaston Silvestre
Malillany Marín as Estrellita Martinez
Nora Parra as Sor Maria
Johanna Murillo as Debbie Parker
Amanda Rosa as Wanda Dos Santos
Roberto Espejo as Lissandro Beltrani
Wendy Braga as Yolanda Del Mar
Pascual Reyes  
Felipe Garcia Naranjo as Tony
Genia Santini as TV show host
Lorenza Aldrete as Muñeca Perez Robles
Héctor Gutiérrez as Cornelio Niño
Brian Hatch as Priest
Jacinto Marina as Fefugio Miranda

References

External links 
 

2014 films
2014 comedy-drama films
2010s Spanish-language films
2014 comedy films
Mexican comedy-drama films
2010s Mexican films